CJFL-FM, also known as "CIY368" was a Canadian LPFM radio station, broadcasting at 104.7 FM in Iroquois Falls, Ontario.

History
The station went on the air in 2005 at 105.5 FM and broadcasts a community radio variety format, including oldies, country, easy listening, Top 40, dance and rock music.

In 2007, CJFL-FM moved to 104.7 FM.

CIY368 was a call sign of one of the many CRTC exempt undertakings that was operated by Joel Lagace prior to the latest long term CRTC approved undertaking, In Iroquois Falls.

On March 10, 2010, an application by Joel Lagacé, on behalf of a corporation to be incorporated, for a broadcasting licence to operate an English-language Type B community FM radio programming undertaking in Iroquois Falls. The applicant proposes a mixed music/pop, rock and dance music format. The application received approval by the CRTC on July 21, 2010. The station was later known as Cruise FM.

Closure
On July 18, 2014, Lagacé announced the closure of the station, airing the following message as well as a loop with the songs "Over My Shoulder" by Mike and the Mechanics, "Pompeii" by Bastille, and "A New Day" by Celine Dion.

References

External links 
  "104.7 The Variety Station".
CJFL-FM history - Canadian Communications Foundation (listed under wrong call sign as CFJL-FM instead of CJFL-FM)
 

Jfl
Jfl
Radio stations established in 2005
2005 establishments in Ontario
JFL

2014_disestablishments_in_Ontario 
Radio_stations_disestablished_in_2014
JFL-FM